The Devonshire Hunting Tapestries are a group of four magnificent "Flemish tapestries", in fact probably made in Arras in Artois, France, dating from around 1430 to 1450. These enormous works, each over 3 metres wide, depict men and women in fashionable dress of the early fifteenth century hunting in a forest. The tapestries formerly belonged to the Dukes of Devonshire, but in 1957 were accepted by HM Government in lieu of tax payable on the estate of the 10th Duke of Devonshire and allocated to the Victoria and Albert Museum, where they remain. 

The 6th Duke described using his 'spare' tapestry to insulate the Long Gallery at Hardwick Hall in the 1840s, a practice which saved these rare Gothic hangings from being discarded. The tapestries depict a Deer Hunt, Falconry, a Swan and Otter Hunt and a Boar and Bear Hunt. The hunt was a particularly powerful theme and would have been a familiar pastime to many of the high-born individuals and families who owned tapestries. Hunting was both a stylized sport and an important source of the only meats considered noble.

This detail is from the Boar and Bear Hunt Tapestry, made in the 1420s, and shows men carrying special boar-spears, which have cross-bars designed to stop the charge of the boar and keep its deadly tusks at arm's length. Much of the charm of these scenes lies in the elaborate costume detail. The lady crossing the stream on the lower right has 'Monte le Desire' inscribed on her flowing sleeve. This is the opening line of a popular song of the period. The practice of embellishing one's clothes with such words was a medieval equivalent of having a stylish slogan printed on a T-shirt except that, in the tapestry, weaving on a horizontal loom has reversed the letters.

The dress of the participants is of the type worn at court, particularly that of Burgundy, which had control of the tapestry-weaving areas in the southern Netherlands. It is unlikely that any serious hunting took place in such restricting and exotic clothes.

References

External links
View the Tapestries
"The sign of the dog: an examination of the Devonshire hunting tapestries", Ann Claxton, Journal of Medieval History, Volume 14,  Issue 2, 1988

Collections of the Victoria and Albert Museum
Tapestries
Animals in art
Dogs in art
Hunting in art
Pigs in art